The 1901–02 season was Athletic Club's 1st season in existence. The club played some friendly matches against local clubs such as Bilbao FC. Athletic also played their first match outside of the Basque Country against Club Español (now RCD Espanyol) at the Copa de la Coronación in Madrid.

Summary

 11 June: The club's Board was then elected, with Luis Márquez being appointed the first president of the club, Francisco Íñiguez as vice-president, José María Barquín as treasurer and Enrique Goiri as its secretary, while Juan Astorquia and Alfred Mills were named the team's captain and vice-captain respectively. Since the figure of coach as we know it today did not exist at the time, it was Astorquia and Mills, as captain of the clubs, who was in charge of making up the line-ups and dictating the tactics to be followed. The most logical name for a new football club founded in Bilbao (Bilbao Football Club) was already "taken", so the name they chose was Athletic Club, using the English spelling. The name is an apparent homage to the Club Atleta of the Nervión Shipyards (1889–94).

 5 September: The Club is officially established after obtaining the permission of the Civil Government. In the infamous meeting held at Café García, 33 members signed the documents to make it official and register as a sports organization with the local council. In addition to the 7 original founders of 1898, Juan Astorquia, Alejandro Acha, Luis Márquez, Fernando and Pedro Iraolagoitia, Enrique Goiri and Eduardo Montejo; that group also included the likes of Alejandro de la Sota, the Arana brothers (Amado and César), the Silba brothers (Ramón and Luis), Juan Astorquia's brother, Luis, Antonio Zubillaga, and Alfred Mills, who was the only foreign-born person among the 33 who signed the documents.

 10 November: Athletic Club played its first-ever match against another club in a friendly against Bilbao FC at the Lamiako fields. It ended in a 0–0 draw.

 Mid-November: Since there were hardly any fields in Bilbao, the two sides agreed to share the Lamiako field, which they rented together. Lamiako was thus the home to one of the first great rivalries in the history of Spanish football.

 19 January 1902: Athletic Club secured its first-ever win after beating Bilbao FC 4–2 with goals from Juan Astorquia (2), Ramón Silva and Mario Arana. It was also the first time that a paid match was held in Vizcaya, since this time they charged a ticket price of 30 cents of a peseta.

 Early-March: The two rivals agreed to join the best players of each club to play two games against the Bordeaux-based side Burdigala. This temporary merge became known as Club Bizcaya.

 9 March: Bizcaya played its first match on foreign territory, winning 2–0 in Buerdos, France with goals from Ramón Silva and Walter Evans.

 31 March: Bizcaya played the return fixture at home, the very first visit by a foreign team to Bilbao, trashing the French side with a resounding 7–0 victory with a poker from William Dyer and a hat-trick from Juan Astorquia. Lamiako had its record attendance on that day, gathering a crowd of three thousand spectators, a tremendous amount at the time.

 13 May: Athletic Club played its first competitive match in the Copa de la Coronación and also secured its first competitive victory with a 5–1 win over Club Español (now RCD Espanyol). Juan Astorquia scored the club's first competitive goal, William Dyer scored the club's first competitive penalty and Walter Evans scored the club's first competitive hat-trick.

 14 May: Athletic Club trashes New Foot-Ball Club in the semi-finals of the Copa de la Coronación with a resounding 8–1 victory, with a poker from Bilbao FC's William Dyer, two goals from Walter Evans of Bilbao FC and a goal each from Astorquia and French Armand Cazeaux, both of Athletic.

 15 May: Athletic Club wins its first-ever piece of silverware after a 2–1 win over FC Barcelona in the final, courtesy of Astorquia and Cazeaux. The trophy was presented by the mayor of Madrid and Bizcaya returned to Bilbao with it. Athletic still has that trophy in their trophy room at the San Mamés stadium.

Squad

Source:

Results

References

1901–02 in Spanish football
1901–02